Rahsaan Roland Kirk (born Ronald Theodore Kirk; August 7, 1935 – December 5, 1977), known earlier in his career simply as Roland Kirk, was an American jazz multi-instrumentalist who played tenor saxophone, flute, and many other instruments. He was renowned for his onstage vitality, during which virtuoso improvisation was accompanied by comic banter, political ranting, and the ability to play several instruments simultaneously.

Life 
Ronald Theodore Kirk was born in Columbus, Ohio, where he lived in a neighborhood known as Flytown. He became blind at two years old, which he said was a result of improper medical treatment. As a teenager, Kirk studied at the Ohio State School for the Blind. By age fifteen he was on the road playing rhythm and blues on weekends with Boyd Moore's band. According to saxophonist Hank Crawford, "He would be like this 14-year-old blind kid playing two horns at once. They would bring him out and he would tear the joint up." Crawford heard him during this period and said he was unbelievable. He remarked, "Now they had him doing all kinds of goofy stuff but he was playing the two horns and he was playing the shit out of them. He was an original from the beginning." Kirk felt compelled by a dream to transpose two letters in his first name to make '"Roland". In 1970, Kirk added "Rahsaan" to his name after hearing it in a dream.

Kirk was politically outspoken. During his concerts, between songs he often talked about topical issues, including African-American history and the Civil Rights Movement. His monologues were often laced with satire and absurdist humor. According to comedian Jay Leno, when Leno toured with Kirk as Kirk's opening act, Kirk would introduce him by saying: "I want to introduce a young brother who knows the black experience and knows all about the white devils.... Please welcome Jay Leno!"

In 1975, Kirk had a major stroke which led to partial paralysis of one side of his body. He continued to perform and record, modifying his instruments to enable him to play with one arm. At a live performance at Ronnie Scott's Jazz Club in London he even managed to play two instruments, and carried on to tour internationally and to appear on television.

He died from a second stroke in 1977, aged 42, the morning after performing in the Frangipani Room of the Indiana University Student Union in Bloomington, Indiana.

Columbus Mayor Jack Sensenbrenner had declared Saturday, Dec. 10, 1970, “Rahsaan day,” according to the Columbus Dispatch obituary that appeared on Thursday, Dec. 8, 1977.

Instruments and techniques 

Kirk's musical career spans from 1955 until his death in 1977. He preferred to lead his own bands and rarely performed as a sideman, although he did record with arranger Quincy Jones, drummer Roy Haynes and worked with bassist Charles Mingus. One of his best-known recorded performances is the lead flute and solo on Jones' "Soul Bossa Nova", a 1964 hit song repopularized in the Austin Powers films.

Kirk's multi-instrumentality was credited as having a substantial musical conception. This inclusivity included blues music, a love of stride piano and early jazz, and an appreciation for pop tunes. But his vision was much wider than that of most of his contemporaries. According to producer Joel Dorn, he was also hugely knowledgeable about classical music. Pieces by Saint-Saens, Hindemith, Tchaikovsky, Dvorak and Villa-Lobos would all feature on his albums over the years, alongside standards, pop songs and original compositions. Rahsaan's influences went beyond jazz and consequentially, he preferred the term "Black Classical Music".

His playing was generally rooted in soul jazz or hard bop, but Kirk's knowledge of jazz history allowed him to draw from many elements of the music's past, from ragtime to swing and free jazz. Kirk also absorbed classical influences, and his artistry reflected elements of pop music by composers such as Smokey Robinson and Burt Bacharach, as well as Duke Ellington, John Coltrane and other jazz musicians.

Kirk played and collected many musical instruments, mainly multiple saxophones, clarinets and flutes. His primary saxophones were a standard tenor saxophone, stritch (a straight alto sax lacking the instrument's conventional upturned bell), and a manzello (a modified saxello soprano sax, with a larger, upturned bell). A number of his instruments were exotic or homemade. Kirk modified instruments himself to accommodate his simultaneous playing technique. Critic Gary Giddins wrote that Kirk's tenor playing alone was enough to bring him "renown".

Usually, he appeared on stage with all three horns hanging around his neck, and at times he would play a number of these horns at once, harmonizing with himself, or sustain a note for lengthy durations by using circular breathing. He used the multiple horns to play true chords, essentially functioning as a one-man saxophone section. Kirk insisted that he was only trying to emulate the sounds he heard in his head. Even while playing two or three saxophones at once, the music was intricate, powerful jazz with a strong feel for the blues. The live album Bright Moments (1973) is an example of one of his shows.

Kirk was also an influential flute player, including recorders. According to Giddins, Kirk was the first major jazz innovator on flute after Eric Dolphy (who died in 1964). Kirk employed several techniques, including singing or humming into the flute at the same time as playing. Another was to play the standard transverse flute at the same time as a nose flute.

He played a variety of other instruments, including whistles; often kept a gong within reach; the clarinet, harmonica, English horn, and was a competent trumpeter. He utilized unique approaches, such as playing a trumpet with a saxophone mouthpiece.

He also made use of non-musical devices, such as alarm clocks, sirens, or a section of common garden hose (dubbed "the black mystery pipes"). From the early 1970s, his studio recordings used tape-manipulated musique concrète and primitive electronic sounds before such things became commonplace.

The Case of the 3 Sided Dream in Audio Color was a unique album in the annals of recorded jazz and popular music. It was a two-LP set, with Side 4 apparently "blank", the label not indicating any content. However, once word of "the secret message" got around among Rahsaan's fans, one would find that about 12 minutes into Side 4 appeared the first of two telephone answering machine messages recorded by Kirk, the second following soon thereafter (but separated by more blank grooves). The surprise impact of these segments appearing on "blank" Side 4 was lost on the initial CD reissue of this album (though restored as track 20 on the CD re-release).

He gleaned information on what was happening in the world via radio and TV. His later recordings often incorporated his spoken commentaries on current events, including Richard Nixon's involvement in the Watergate scandal. The 3-Sided Dream album was a "concept album" which incorporated "found" or environmental sounds and tape loops, tapes being played backwards, etc. Snippets of Billie Holiday singing are also heard briefly. The album even confronts the rise of influence of computers in society, as Rahsaan threatens to pull the plug on the machine trying to tell him what to do.

In the album Other Folks' Music the spoken words of Paul Robeson, another outspoken black artist, can be briefly heard.

Legacy and influence 
 Ian Anderson, leader and flautist of Jethro Tull recorded a version of Kirk's "Serenade to a Cuckoo" on their first album This Was (1968). Roland Kirk was the very reason Anderson thought he could bring a flute into rock music. Anderson learned Kirk's vocalizing style on the flute and Anderson's flute playing became the signature element of Jethro Tull's sound. Kirk and Anderson took the flute's refined upper crust classical nature and commonized it. Anderson got to know Kirk at the 1969 Newport Jazz Festival where they both performed the same night. Anderson said of Kirk "There’s something about these colourful shamans. They can tease us, but we go along with it, because we know they’re touched by genius, but at the same time there’s a little bit of the snake oil for sale.”
 Jeff Coffin, the saxophonist in Béla Fleck and the Flecktones was heavily influenced by Kirk's music and says he learned through Kirk that it's OK to experiment with an instrument. He used Kirk's multi-horn inventions with the Flecktones and on his solo album Mutopia.
 Guitarist Jimi Hendrix "idolized" Kirk, and even hoped to collaborate with him one day.
 Frank Zappa had been influenced by Kirk's music to a considerable extent early in his career. In the liner notes to his 1966 debut album with The Mothers of Invention, Freak Out!, Zappa cites Kirk as one of many in a lengthy list of personal musical influences. Kirk and Zappa performed live together at least once, at the 1969 Boston Globe Jazz Festival.
Derek Trucks, a huge Kirk fan, recorded Kirk's composition “Volunteered Slavery” with his namesake group for the 2004 album Live at Georgia Theatre, the 2006 studio album Songlines, and the DVD Songlines Live. He said that hearing Kirk's music "felt much the same way those Hendrix records felt, that he was blowing the rules wide open..."
 David Jackson, of Van der Graaf Generator, was also highly influenced by the style and technique of Kirk, and he plays multiple saxophones simultaneously since at least 1969.
 Guitarist Michael Angelo Batio said in a 2008 interview with Ultimate Guitar Archive that Kirk's playing of two saxophones at once inspired him to create his "double guitar".
 T.J. Kirk was a band named after the three artists it tributed: Thelonious Monk, James Brown, and Rahsaan Roland Kirk. Formed by eight-string guitarist Charlie Hunter as a side group to his own self-titled band, the band's other members include Scott Amendola, Will Bernard, and John Schott.
 Paul Weller cited the Kirk album I Talk with the Spirits (1964) as one of his "Most Influential Albums" in an interview with The Times in 2009.
 Björk named The Inflated Tear as one of her favorite jazz pieces, calling it "primitive and instinctive", "open to nature", and "punk".
 Davey Payne's twin saxophone solo on "Hit Me with Your Rhythm Stick" (Ian Dury & the Blockheads, 1978) was inspired by Kirk.
 Terry Edwards' twin saxophone solo on "The Ministry of Defence" by PJ Harvey (2016) was inspired by Kirk.
 Eric Burdon and War's 1970 debut album Eric Burdon Declares War features the track "The Vision of Rassan", which is broken up into two pieces "Dedication" and "Roll on Kirk".
 The English post-punk group Rip Rig + Panic  were named after the album of the same name by Roland Kirk.
 Clutch pay tribute to Roland Kirk in the song "Three Golden Horns" off their 2022 album Sunrise on Slaughter Beach.

Discography

As leader 
King Records
 Triple Threat (1956)

Argo/Cadet/Chess Records
 Introducing Roland Kirk (1960)

Prestige Records
 Kirk's Work (1961)

Mercury Records
 1961: We Free Kings
 1962: Domino
 1963: Reeds & Deeds
 1963: The Roland Kirk Quartet Meets the Benny Golson Orchestra
 1964: Kirk in Copenhagen
 1964: Gifts & Messages
 
Limelight Records
 1964: I Talk with the Spirits
 1965: Slightly Latin
 1965: Rip, Rig and Panic

Verve Records
 Now Please Don't You Cry, Beautiful Edith (1967)

Atlantic Records
 1965: Here Comes the Whistleman
 1967: The Inflated Tear
 1968: Left & Right
 1969: Volunteered Slavery
 1970: Rahsaan Rahsaan
 1971: Natural Black Inventions: Root Strata
 1972: Blacknuss
 1972: A Meeting of the Times
 1973: Prepare Thyself to Deal With a Miracle
 1973: Bright Moments
 1975: The Case of the 3 Sided Dream in Audio Color
 1976: Other Folks' Music

Warner Bros. Records
 1976: The Return of the 5000 Lb. Man
 1977: Kirkatron
 1977: Boogie-Woogie String Along for Real

Posthumous releases of new material
 The Man Who Cried Fire (Night, 1990)
 I, Eye, Aye: Live at the Montreux Jazz Festival, 1972 (Rhino, 1996) – live recorded in 1972
 Dog Years in the Fourth Ring (32 Jazz, 1997) – recorded in 1963-75
 Compliments of the Mysterious Phantom (Hyena, 2003) – live recorded in 1974
 Brotherman in the Fatherland (Hyena, 2006) – live recorded in Germany in 1972

Compilations and box sets
 Hip (Fontana, 1965)
 Rahsaan: The Complete Mercury Recordings of Roland Kirk (Mercury, 1990)[10CD]
 Does Your House Have Lions: The Rahsaan Roland Kirk Anthology (Rhino, 1993)[2CD]
 Simmer, Reduce, Garnish & Serve (Warner Archives, 1995) – compilation from his last three albums
 Talkin' Verve: Roots of Acid Jazz (Verve, 1996)
 The Art of Rahsaan Roland Kirk - The Atlantic (Atlantic, 1996)[2LP]
 Aces Back to Back (32 Jazz, 1998)[4CD] – combines Left & Right (1968), Rahsaan Rahsaan (1970), Prepare Thyself to Deal With a Miracle (1973) and Other Folks' Music (1976)
 A Standing Eight (32 Jazz, 1998)[2CD] – combines The Return of the 5000 Lb. Man (1976), Kirkatron (1977) and Boogie-Woogie String Along for Real (1977)
 Left Hook, Right Cross (32 Jazz, 1999)[2CD] – combines Volunteered Slavery (1969) and Blacknuss (1972)
 Third Dimension and Beyond (Gambit, 2005) – combines Triple Threat (1957) and Introducing Roland Kirk (1960)
 Only The Best of Rahsaan Roland Kirk Volume 1 (Collectables, 2009)[7CD] – combines Blacknuss, The Case of the 3 Sided Dream in Audio Color, The Inflated Tear/Natural Black Inventions: Root Strata, Kirkatron, Boogie-Woogie String Along for Real, and Other Folks' Music

As sideman 
With Jaki Byard
 The Jaki Byard Experience (Prestige, 1969) – recorded in 1968

With Tubby Hayes
 Tubby's Back in Town (Smash, 1962)

With Roy Haynes
 Out of the Afternoon (Impulse!, 1962)

With Quincy Jones
 Big Band Bossa Nova (Mercury, 1962)
 Quincy Jones Explores the Music of Henry Mancini (Mercury, 1964)
 I/We Had a Ball (Limelight, 1965) – recorded in 1964–65
 Quincy Plays for Pussycats (Mercury, 1965) – recorded in 1959–65
 In the Heat of the Night OST (United Artists, 1967)
 Walking in Space (CTI, 1969)

With Les McCann
 Live at Montreux (Atlantic, 1973) – live recorded in 1972

With Charles Mingus
 Tonight at Noon (Atlantic, 1964) – recorded in 1961
 Oh Yeah (Atlantic, 1962)
 Mingus at Carnegie Hall (Atlantic, 1974)

With Tommy Peltier
 The Jazz Corps Under the Direction of Tommy Peltier (Pacific Jazz, 1967)

Bibliography 
 Jones, Quincy (Composer). (1964). Big Band Bossa Nova [Phonograph]. Mercury. (Reissued on compact disc by Verve in 1998, 2005)
 Kruth, John: Bright Moments. The Life and Legacy of Rahsaan Roland Kirk. Welcome Rain Publishers, New York 2000 
 McLeod, Eric (Producer), & Roach, Jay (Director). (1997). Austin Powers: International man of mystery [DVD]. New Line Home Video
 Kahan, Adam (Filmmaker). (2014). Rahsaan Roland Kirk, The Case of the Three Sided Dream [DVD]. Documentary

References

External links

Rahsaan Roland Kirk discography at Jazz Discography Project
Rahsaan Roland Kirk Rahsaan Roland Kirk: The Cases of the Three Sided Dream, a documentary by Adam Kahan
Rahsaan Roland Kirk Sound??, film of Kirk with John Cage at UbuWeb
Rahsaan Roland Kirk and The Vibration Society performing live (October 1972), video, thirteen.org
Rahsaan Roland Kirk quintet. Three for Festival and Volunteered Slavery, live performance (1975), video, jazzonthetube.com

1935 births
1977 deaths
African-American saxophonists
American jazz composers
American male jazz composers
American jazz flautists
American jazz saxophonists
American male saxophonists
American multi-instrumentalists
Atlantic Records artists
Avant-garde jazz musicians
Blind musicians
Cor anglais players
Hard bop musicians
Musicians from Columbus, Ohio
Soul-jazz musicians
Chess Records artists
King Records artists
Mercury Records artists
Prestige Records artists
Verve Records artists
Warner Records artists
20th-century American composers
20th-century American saxophonists
Jazz musicians from Ohio
20th-century American male musicians
20th-century jazz composers
20th-century African-American musicians
American blind people
Spiritual jazz musicians
20th-century flautists
Argo Records artists